Piz Saluver (3,161 m) is a mountain of the Albula Alps, located west of Celerina in the canton of Graubünden. It lies between the Val Bever and the Val Saluver, both part of the Engadin.

References

External links
 Piz Saluver on Hikr

Mountains of the Alps
Mountains of Graubünden
Mountains of Switzerland